Oli Silk is a British smooth jazz keyboardist, producer, and composer.

In 2006, Silk made his debut at the Catalina Island JazzTrax Festival, and later that year he was named Debut Artist of the Year by Smooth Jazz News magazine and Art Good's Jazztrax.com  Also in that year, his song "Easy Does It" hit No. 19 on the Billboard Smooth Jazz chart.

"Chill or Be Chilled," his song, peaked at No. 3 on the Billboard Smooth Jazz chart and No. 5 on the Top Smooth Jazz Songs 2009 chart in 2009.

In January 2014 Silk's song "At Your Service" (feat. Julian Vaughn) reached Number 1 on the Smooth Jazz chart.

Silk was nominated International Artist of the Year 2010 by the American Smooth Jazz Awards.

Discography 
 Fact or Friction (Heaven Cent, 2000)
 Duality (Passion, 2002)
 So Many Ways (Trippin' 'N' Rhythm, 2006)
 The Limit's the Sky (Trippin' N' Rhythm, 2008)
 All We Need (Trippin' N' Rhythm, 2010)
 Razor Sharp Brit (Trippin' N' Rhythm, 2013)
 Where I Left Off (Trippin' N' Rhythm, 2016)
 6 (Trippin' N' Rhythm, 2020)

References

External links 
 

Living people
Smooth jazz pianists
21st-century pianists
Year of birth missing (living people)